Bartal Wardum (born 3 May 1997) is a Faroese footballer who plays as a defender for HB and the Faroe Islands national team.

Career
Wardum made his international debut for the Faroe Islands on 11 November 2020 in a friendly match against Lithuania.

Career statistics

International

References

External links
 Bartal Wardum at FaroeSoccer.com
 
 

1997 births
Living people
Faroese footballers
Faroe Islands youth international footballers
Faroe Islands under-21 international footballers
Faroe Islands international footballers
Association football defenders
Havnar Bóltfelag players
Faroe Islands Premier League players
1. deild players
2. deild players